Theodore Moody Berry (November 8, 1905 – October 15, 2000) is an American politician of the Charter Party of Cincinnati, Ohio and was the first African-American mayor of Cincinnati, Ohio.

Early life and education
Born in poverty in Maysville, Kentucky, on November 8, 1905, Ted Berry overcame great obstacles to achieve personal success and gain a national reputation as a leader in the Civil Rights Movement. He graduated from Woodward High School in 1924 and served as class valedictorian, the first African American to hold that honor in Cincinnati. In his senior year, he won an essay contest with an entry submitted under the pseudonym Thomas Playfair after an all-white panel had rejected his initial entry. Berry worked at steel mills in Newport, Kentucky, to pay tuition at the University of Cincinnati and then at its law school.

Legal career
Berry was admitted to the Ohio Bar in 1932. He served as president of the Cincinnati branch of the NAACP from 1932 to 1946. In 1938 he was appointed the first black assistant prosecuting attorney for Hamilton County.

Military service
During World War II, Berry worked in the Office of War Information as a morale officer. The job took him to Washington, D.C. and also caused him to change his political affiliation from Republican to Democrat. In 1945, Berry defended three black Army Air Force officers, members of the Tuskegee Airmen, who had protested a segregated officer's club in Indiana. He won acquittal for two of the men. In 1995, the Air Force pardoned the third who had been convicted.

NAACP service
From 1947 to 1961, Berry served on the NAACP Ohio Committee for Civil Rights Legislation where he worked on equal employment and fair housing issues. He was also involved with the Urban League of Greater Cincinnati.

Political career
He began his Cincinnati political career in 1947 when he ran for City Council. He lost that year but won in 1949. He was chairman of the finance committee in 1953 and led a controversial battle to create a city income tax. In 1955 he was elected vice mayor. His 1963 political campaign to return to Cincinnati's City Council was chaired by Rev. L. Venchael Booth. His creation of the Community Action Commission in Cincinnati caught the attention of Sargent Shriver. In 1965 President Lyndon Johnson appointed Berry to head the Office of Economic Opportunity's Community Action Programs that included Head Start, the Job Corps and Legal Services. Berry returned to Cincinnati in 1969 and was appointed to City Council in 1971. He was elected mayor in 1972 and served for four years—Cincinnati's first African-American mayor. In the 1980s and 1990s, Berry struggled to return proportional representation to Cincinnati because he firmly believed that it gave a fair share of power to Black voters.

Death and legacy

Berry died at the age of 94 on October 15, 2000. Other prominent black Cincinnatians such as Marian Spencer and Judge Nathaniel R. Jones considered Ted Berry a role model. The city of Cincinnati has named both a street and a park after Berry.

Associations and awards
Mayor Berry was a Prince Hall Freemason  and a member of Alpha Phi Alpha fraternity, Alpha Alpha chapter. He was one of the founders that helped charter Alpha Rho Lambda Chapter, December 21, 1929, in Columbus, Ohio. In 1979, the NAACP honored Berry by awarding him the William Robert Ming Advocacy Award for the spirit of financial and personal sacrifice displayed in his legal work.

References

External links
Finding Aid for Theodore M. Berry papers, Archives and Rare Books Library, University of Cincinnati, Cincinnati, Ohio

1905 births
2000 deaths
Mayors of Cincinnati
NAACP activists
African-American lawyers
Ohio lawyers
University of Cincinnati alumni
American civil rights lawyers
Charter Party politicians
People from Maysville, Kentucky
20th-century American politicians
African-American mayors in Ohio
People of the United States Office of War Information
Woodward High School (Cincinnati, Ohio) alumni
20th-century American lawyers
20th-century African-American politicians
African-American men in politics